Blair Academy is a coeducational, boarding and day school for students in high school. The school serves students from ninth through twelfth grades as well as a small post-graduate class.

As of the 2022–23 school year, the school had an enrollment of 465 students and 84 classroom teachers (on an FTE basis), for a student–teacher ratio of 6:1. The school's student body was 53.8% (250) White, 23.7% (110) Asian, 8.2% (38) Black, 11.4% (53) two or more races and 3.0% (14) Hispanic.

Academics
Blair's academic program follows the traditional four-year college-preparatory plan. Diploma requirements are governed by college entrance requirements.

Athletics
Blair primarily competes in the Mid-Atlantic Prep League (which includes Blair Academy, The Peddie School, The Lawrenceville School, The Hill School, Hun School of Princeton and Mercersburg Academy). The school's traditional mascot is the "Buccaneer" (with the team called the Bucs) and the school colors are navy blue, white and grey. Blair's traditional arch-rival is The Peddie School of Hightstown, New Jersey. Since 1903, Blair and Peddie have competed in football, and the rivalry constitutes New Jersey's oldest continuous prep football competition.   Each November, the two schools vie for the coveted Kelley-Potter Cup by playing against one another in a fall sports competition.

During the days leading up to Peddie Day, spirit abounds at Blair. The campus is bedecked with banners hanging from windows, often poking fun at Peddie's Falcon mascot (known to Blair as the Peddie Chickens). On Peddie Day "Eve," a spirited pep rally, torch procession and stories-high bonfire pave the way for a day of athletic competition. On Peddie Day held at Blair in November 2021, Blair claimed the Kelly-Potter Cup for the ninth time.

The most successful athletic program is wrestling.  Under previous head wrestling coach Jeff Buxton, the team won 31 consecutive National Prep Titles (from 1981–2012) and produced a number of NCAA champions and Olympic gold medalist Robert B. Weaver. Most recently, Blair has produced PAC12 Champion Evan Martin Silver. He has gone on to wrestle for Stanford University after leading as wrestling team captain at Blair. The academy's wrestling team is considered one of the most successful high school wrestling programs in the nation, winning 10 National Team Championships.

The boys swimming team won the NJSIAA state Non-Public state championship in 1926, 1932 and 1935-1940.

Blair's basketball program has developed alums including NBA players Luol Deng, Charlie Villanueva, and Royal Ivey.

Former Blair football player Dion Lewis was drafted in the 5th round of the 2011 NFL Draft by the Philadelphia Eagles. He has received numerous honors in 2010 such as, Sporting News Top 5 Heisman Trophy Candidate, Top 25 Overall Players (No. 6), All America Team (first team), All-Big East, as well as ESPN.com "Big East's 25 Best" No.1.

Facilities
Almost all campus architecture is in the Richardson Romanesque style, and modern buildings reflect the features and themes of the older structures.  There are five major academic buildings: Clinton Hall, Bogle Science Center, Timken Library, Armstrong-Hipkins Center for the Arts and the Chiang-Elghanayan Center for Innovation and Collaboration. 

Bogle Science Center, dedicated in 1989 and expanded and renovated in 2019, provides laboratories and classrooms for the science department and includes the 100-seat Cowan Auditorium. Armstrong-Hipkins Center for the Arts was dedicated in 1997 and includes the 500-seat DuBois Theatre, the black box Wean Theatre, and practice rooms. The renovated Timken Library opened in 1998. Annie Hall, a girls' dormitory, opened in the fall of 1999. The Romano Dining Hall was completed in the fall of 2000, and renovation of Insley Hall was completed in 2001. 

A major expansion and renovation of the school's athletic and activities facilities and fields occurred between 2006 and 2009: a lighted, synthetic turf field for football, field hockey, and soccer, with new stands, press box, and 400 meter all-weather track; ten new tennis courts (five lighted), a new junior varsity baseball field, and expansion of the existing, natural grass fields.  The renovation and expansion of the existing athletic center, including a new student center, concluded in March 2009.  This facility, known as Hardwick Hall, houses seven squash courts, three gymnasiums, wrestling facilities, aerobic space, a fitness center, a training room, and locker rooms, and also includes Blair Commons, home of the School's bookstore, The Black Canteen, and college counseling offices. Blair's athletic facilities also include a nine-hole golf course. 

The School's pedestrian campus was completed in 2010, making the center of campus vehicle-free. In 2015, the School opened Kathryn Hall, an upper-school girls' dormitory, and Lakeside Hall, an upper-school boys' dormitory, each of which includes three faculty apartments. The Chiang-Elghanayan Center for Innovation and Collaboration, a modern, technology-rich academic facility was completed in 2017 and serves as home to Blair's technology and fine arts departments. Also in 2017, Weber Hall was renovated to best facilitate the teaching of math. In 2018, Blair added the J. Li Golf Training Center and seasonal winter sports complex to its athletic facilities. In 2021 a crew training center was opened and the "Shipyard" outdoor basketball court was named.

Statistics

Enrollment 
Characteristics of the student body:
Total Enrollment: 465 (82% boarding / 18% day)
Male/Female Ratio: 50% / 50%
Number of postgraduate students: 8
Number of countries represented: 29 (17% of student body)
Number of states represented: 26

Tuition and fees
For the 2022–23 academic year, Blair charges $70,200 for tuition, room and board. Day students are charged $48,900, which covers tuition, study rooms, and meals at school.

In rankings based on tuition, room and board and required fees for the 2013–14 school year, Business Insider ranked the school as the 29th-most-expensive boarding school in the United States. The school was 26th-most expensive based on the publication's rankings based on 2012-13 data.

Faculty
Student/Faculty Ratio: 6:1
Head of School: Peter G. Curran

Accreditation
Middle States Association of Colleges and Schools Commission on Elementary and Secondary Schools (since 1928). The school's accreditation status was extended for seven years in Fall 2018.

School memberships
ADVIS – Association of Delaware Valley Independent Schools
CASE – Council for Advancement and Support of Education
NAIS – National Association of Independent Schools
NJAIS - New Jersey Association of Independent Schools

Endowment
Current Market Value (approximate): $140 million as of June 30, 2022.

Campus
The campus, set among  of rolling hills in the shadow of the Delaware Water Gap, is home to numerous grand old buildings and in 1992 was entered into the National Register of Historic Places in recognition of its historic and architectural significance.

In the 1960s and 1970s, the campus was used in the summer by Camp Racquet, a tennis camp run by Charlie Lundgren, then the coach of the tennis team at Upsala College.

Notable alumni

Mahlon Apgar IV (born 1958), businessman and former Assistant Secretary of the Army.
 John C. "Jack" Bogle (1929–2019), founder of The Vanguard Group.
 John W. Campbell (1910–1971), science fiction writer who was editor of Astounding Science Fiction from 1937 until his death.
 John Cassavetes (1929–1989), actor, screenwriter and director.
 Anthony D'Amato (born 1987), songwriter and singer signed to New West Records.
 Branson DeCou (1892–1941), photographer and traveler
 Luol Deng (born 1985), former professional basketball player for the Chicago Bulls, Cleveland Cavaliers, Miami Heat, Los Angeles Lakers, and Minnesota Timberwolves.
 Jordan Dingle (born 2000), college basketball player for the Penn Quakers of the Ivy League.
 Tim Eustace (born 1956, class of 1974), member of the New Jersey General Assembly from the 38th Legislative District from 2012 to 2018.
 Christine Evans (born 1990), songwriter.
 A.J. Ferrari (born 2001, class of 2020), wrestler at the Oklahoma State University.
 Reid Fliehr (1988–2013), professional wrestler.
 Thomas F. Goldsmith (1938-2020, class of 1957), mayor of Easton, Pennsylvania 1993-2003.
 Bob Guccione (1930–2010), Penthouse magazine publisher 
 John R. Guthrie (1921–2009, class of 1938), United States Army four-star general.
 James Hagerty (1909–1981), White House Press Secretary during the presidency of Dwight D. Eisenhower
 Max Heidegger (born 1997), American-Israeli basketball player for Maccabi Tel Aviv of the Israeli Basketball Premier League.
 Andrew R. Heinze (born 1955, class of 1973), writer and scholar of American history.
 Royal Ivey (born 1981), former professional basketball player, currently an assistant coach with the New York Knicks.
 George P. Jenkins Jr. (1915–2009), Former Chairman of Metropolitan Life.
 Jesse L. Lasky Jr. (1910–1988), screenwriter, novelist, playwright and poet.
 Dion Lewis (born 1990), running back for the University of Pittsburgh and the Tennessee Titans.
 Stuart Loory (born 1932, class of 1950), author/reporter, ex-Managing Editor of the Chicago Sun-Times and Executive Vice President of Turner Networks.
 Tucker Max (born 1975), Internet celebrity and New York Times best-selling author.
 Olivia Miles (born 2003), college basketball player for the Notre Dame Fighting Irish women's basketball team.
 Steve Mocco (born 1981), 2008 Olympic wrestler, professional Mixed Martial Artist, formerly with WSOF
 David Ojabo (born 2000, class of 2019), American football defensive end for the University of Michigan and the NFL Baltimore Ravens 
 Odafe Oweh (born 1998, class of 2018), American football outside linebacker for the NFL Baltimore Ravens
 Frank Perantoni (1923–1991), American football center who played professional football for the New York Yankees.
 Tucker Richardson, college basketball player for the Colgate Raiders
 Justin Robinson (born 1987), professional basketball player for the London Lions of the British Basketball League.
 Ed Ruth (born 1990), mixed martial artist and former freestyle wrestler.
 Albert G. Rutherford (1879–1941), United States Congressman.
 Ed Sabol (1916–2015), founder of NFL Films.
 John Sebastian (born 1944, class of 1962), lead singer and guitarist for the band The Lovin' Spoonful.
 Marial Shayok (born 1995, class of 2014), a Canadian professional basketball player for the Philadelphia 76ers
 Joseph Horace Shull (1848–1944), member of the U.S. House of Representatives from Pennsylvania's 26th congressional district from 1903–1905.
 William E. Simon (1927–2000), a businessman who served as the 63rd Secretary of the Treasury.
 Joe Stanowicz (1921–1999), football player who attended the United States Military Academy where he played at the guard position for the Army Black Knights football team.
 Samuel S. Stratton (1916–1990), United States Congressman.
 Hudson Taylor (born 1987), wrestling coach at Columbia University, straight ally, and founder of Athlete Ally.
 Taki Theodoracopulos (born 1937, class of 1955), conservative writer.
 Mike Tobey (born 1994), professional basketball player for Valencia Basket of the Liga ACB.
 Charlie Villanueva (born 1984), former professional basketball player for the Dallas Mavericks, who is now a free agent.
 Alexis Wangmene (born 1989), Cameroonian basketball player at the University of Texas at Austin.
 Bobby Weaver (born 1958), Olympic Gold Medalist in Wrestling at the 1984 Summer Olympics.

References

External links

Data for Blair Academy, National Center for Education Statistics
The Association of Boarding Schools profile

1848 establishments in New Jersey
Blairstown, New Jersey
Boarding schools in New Jersey
Educational institutions established in 1848
Middle States Commission on Secondary Schools
New Jersey Association of Independent Schools
Presbyterian schools in the United States
Private high schools in Warren County, New Jersey
 
National Register of Historic Places in Warren County, New Jersey
Historic districts on the National Register of Historic Places in New Jersey
Queen Anne architecture in New Jersey
Colonial Revival architecture in New Jersey
New Jersey Register of Historic Places
Christian schools in New Jersey